Tom Driver may refer to:
 Tom Driver (trade unionist), British trade unionist
 Tom F. Driver, American theologian, author and peace activist